Uthamapalayam is a town in Tamil Nadu, India.

Uthamapalayam may also refer to:
 Uthamapalayam block
 Uthamapalayam taluk 
 Uthamapalayam division